The Dean of Chester is based at Chester Cathedral in the Diocese of Chester and is the head of the Chapter at the cathedral.

List of deans

Early modern
1541 Thomas Clerk (first Dean of Chester)
1541–1547 Henry Man (afterwards Bishop of Sodor and Man 1546)
1547–1558 William Clyff
1560–1567 Richard Walker
1567–1572 John Piers (afterwards Dean of Salisbury 1572)
1572–1579 Richard Langworth
1579–1580 Robert Dorset
1580–1589 Thomas Mawdesley
1589–1602 John Nutter
1602–1605 William Barlow (afterwards Bishop of Rochester 1605)
1605–1607 Henry Parry (afterwards Bishop of Gloucester 1607)
1607–1644 Thomas Mallory
1644–1657 William Nichols
1660–1682 Henry Bridgeman (also Bishop of Sodor and Man 1671)
1682–1691 James Arderne
1691–1718 Lawrence Fogg
1718–1721 Walter Offley
1721–1732 Thomas Allen
1732–1758 Thomas Brooke
1758–1787 William Smith
1787–1805 George Cotton

Late modern
1806–1815 Hugh Cholmondeley
1815-1820 Robert Hodgson (afterwards Dean of Carlisle 1820)
1820–1826 Peter Vaughan
1826–1828 Edward Coplestone (afterwardsBishop of Llandaff 1828)
1828–1831 Henry Phillpotts (afterwards Bishop of Exeter 1831)
1831–1839 George Davys (afterwards Bishop of Peterborough 1839)
1839–1867 Frederick Anson
1867–1885 John Howson
1886–1919 John Darby
1920–1937 Frank Bennett
1937–1953 Norman Tubbs (Assistant Bishop until 1948)
1954–1962 Michael Gibbs
1963–1977 George Addleshaw
1978–1986 Ingram Cleasby
1987–2001 Stephen Smalley
200230 September 2017 (ret.) Gordon McPhate
2017–2018 (Acting) Jane Brooke
8 September 2018present Tim Stratford

Sources
'Deans of Chester', Fasti Ecclesiae Anglicanae 1541-1857: volume 11: Carlisle, Chester, Durham, Manchester, Ripon, and Sodor and Man dioceses (2004) accessed 2011-01-24

References

Lists of Anglicans
Deans of Chester
Lists of English people